Sri Venkateshwara College of Engineering (SVCE) is an engineering college in Tirupati, Andhra Pradesh, India. Established in 2007, it is affiliated with Jawaharlal Nehru Technological University, Anantapur (JNTUA), and is recognized by the All India Council for Technical Education (AICTE), New Delhi.

Admissions
Admissions are made on par with other colleges of engineering and technology in the state of Andhra Pradesh through the Common Entrance Test (EAMCET) conducted by the state government. While 70% of the seats allotted are based on merit in EAMCET, 30% of the seats are earmarked for Management Quota. In addition, the Engineering Diploma holders, based on their merit at ECET (FDH), are admitted into Lateral Entry (II year B. Tech Courses) to the tune of 20% of the total intake.

Transport
SVCE has a fleet of vehicles to transport the faculty and students from Tirupati to the college in the mornings and back in the evenings. The bus facility is on payment basis for the students and is free for the staff.

References

Engineering colleges in Andhra Pradesh
Universities and colleges in Tirupati
Educational institutions established in 2007
2007 establishments in Andhra Pradesh